The 2017 World Junior Table Tennis Championships were held in Riva del Garda, Italy, from 26 November to 3 December 2017. It is organised by the Italian Table Tennis Association (FITET) under the auspices and authority of the International Table Tennis Federation (ITTF).

Medal summary

Events

Medal table

See also
2017 World Table Tennis Championships
2017 ITTF World Tour

References

World Junior Table Tennis Championships
World Junior Table Tennis Championships
World Junior Table Tennis Championships
World Junior Table Tennis Championships
Table tennis in Italy
International sports competitions hosted by Italy
World Junior Table Tennis Championships
World Junior Table Tennis Championships